Andørja is a former municipality in Troms county in Norway.  The  municipality existed from 1926 until its dissolution in 1964.  It was located in the northeastern half of the present-day Ibestad Municipality. It encompassed the entire island of Andørja plus a number of other small islands and skerries surrounding it. The administrative centre was located at Engenes where the Andørja Church was also located.

History
The municipality of Andørja was established on 1 July 1926 when the large Ibestad Municipality was separated into four municipalities:  Ibestad (population: 1,768), Andørja (population: 1,420), Astafjord (population: 1,018), and Gratangen (population: 1,967).  During the 1960s, there were many municipal mergers across Norway due to the work of the Schei Committee. On 1 January 1964, the municipalities of Andørja (population: 1,330) and Ibestad (population: 1,821) were merged with the part of neighboring Skånland Municipality that was located on the island of Rolla (population: 134) to form the new, larger Ibestad Municipality.

Name
The name of the municipality and the island of Andørja both come from the Old Norse: Andyrja.  The meaning of the name is not certain, but one theory is that the first element and comes from the word for "against" and the second element yrja means "gravel" or "rocks", possibly referring to the waves from the sea hitting against the rocky shores.

Government

Municipal council
The municipal council  of Andørja was made up of 17 representatives that were elected to four year terms.  The party breakdown of the council was as follows:

See also
List of former municipalities of Norway

References

External links

Andørja Adventures 

Ibestad
Former municipalities of Norway
1926 establishments in Norway
1964 disestablishments in Norway